Stefano Sottile (born 26 January 1998) is an Italian high jumper. He competed at the 2020 Summer Olympics, in High jump.

Career
He won gold medal at the 2015 World Youth Championships in Athletics, finished fourth at the 2019 European U23 Championships and third at the 2019 European Team Championships Super League. He also competed at the 2016 World U20 Championships and the 2019 World Championships without reaching the final.
During the 2019 Italian Athletics Championships he established a World Lead jump of 2.33 m, also qualifying standard for 2020 Summer Games.

National titles
 Italian Athletics Championships
 High jump: 2019 (with 2.33m)
 Italian Indoor Athletics Championships
 High jump: 2018, 2023

Progression

Outdoor

Indoor

Achievements

References

External links

1998 births
Living people
Italian male high jumpers
Athletes (track and field) at the 2014 Summer Youth Olympics
World Athletics Championships athletes for Italy
Italian Athletics Championships winners
Athletics competitors of Fiamme Azzurre
Athletes (track and field) at the 2020 Summer Olympics
Olympic athletes of Italy
People from Borgosesia
Sportspeople from the Province of Vercelli
21st-century Italian people